Fotballklubben Ørn Horten, formerly Ørn fotballklubb, abbreviated Ørn FK, popularly known as De brune or Ørnane, was founded on 4 May 1904, and is Horten's largest football club. The club won the Norwegian Cup four times in the 1920s and '30s and played in the top division during the 1950s and '60s. Since 2022, Ørn plays in the Norwegian Second Division, the third tier of the Norwegian football league system.

Ørn Horten's current head coach is Kjell Andre Thu, a former player at the club. Ørn has developed several talents, recent examples include Adnan Hadzic to Start, Benjamin Zalo to Swedish football and Julian Kristoffersen to Danish football.

Previously, the club also had an active bandy department.

Honours
Norwegian Football Cup:
 Winners (4): 1920, 1927, 1928, 1930
 Runners-up (4): 1916, 1926, 1929, 1932

Players

Current squad

Notable former players
  Bjørn Odmar Andersen
  Trym Bergman
  Harry Boye Karlsen
  Per Bredesen
  Arnar Førsund
  Ardian Gashi
  Jørgen Jalland
  Dag Riisnæs
  Harald Strøm
 Glenn Andersen

Recent seasons

Source:

References

External links 
 Official Website
 Fans Website

Sport in Vestfold og Telemark
Horten
Football clubs in Norway
Association football clubs established in 1904
Bandy clubs established in 1904
1904 establishments in Norway
Defunct bandy clubs in Norway